Ian Hair (born 1954) is a Scottish former professional footballer, who played for Aberdeen and Montrose.

Hair signed for Aberdeen in 1971 and played for them until 1976. He played mostly in defence or midfield, making a total of 98 appearances whilst scoring 6 goals.

Hair then went on to play for Montrose in which he held the highest paid signing for the club.

References

Aberdeen F.C. players
1954 births
Living people
Date of birth missing (living people)
Scottish footballers
Association football midfielders
Montrose F.C. players
Scottish Football League players
Footballers from Glasgow